Babilônia is the 4th and final album by Rita Lee & Tutti Frutti. Though not as successful as their previous efforts, songs like "Miss Brasil 2000" and "Jardins da Babilônia" are fan favorites and Brazilian rock classics.

Track listing

References

1978 albums
Rita Lee albums